Diocese of Santa Rosa may refer to:
Roman Catholic Diocese of Santa Rosa in California
Roman Catholic Diocese of Santa Rosa in Argentina
Roman Catholic Diocese of Santa Rosa de Copán (Honduras)
Roman Catholic Diocese of Santa Rosa de Lima (Guatemala)
Roman Catholic Diocese of Santa Rosa de Osos (Colombia)